Anosodiaphoria is a condition in which a person who has a brain injury seems indifferent to the existence of their impairment. Anosodiaphoria is specifically used in association with indifference to paralysis. It is a somatosensory agnosia, or a sign of neglect syndrome. It might be specifically associated with defective functioning of the frontal lobe of the right hemisphere.

Joseph Babinski first used the term anosodiaphoria in 1914 to describe a disorder of the body schema in which patients verbally acknowledge a clinical problem (such as hemiparesis) but fail to be concerned about it. Anosodiaphoria follows a stage of anosognosia, in which there may be verbal, explicit denial of the illness, and after several days to weeks, develop the lack of emotional response. Indifference is different from denial because it implies a lack of caring on the part of the patient, who otherwise acknowledges his or her deficit.

Causes
A few possible explanations for anosodiaphoria exist:

 The patient is aware of the deficit but does not fully comprehend it or its significance for functioning
 May be related to an affective communication disorder and defective arousal. These emotional disorders cannot account for the verbal explicit denial of illness of anosognosia.

Other explanations include reduced emotional experience, impaired emotional communication, alexithymia, behavioral abnormalities, dysexecutive syndrome, and the frontal lobes.

Neurology
Anosodiaphoria occurs after stroke of the brain. 27% of patients with an acute hemispheric stroke had the stroke in the right hemisphere, while 2% have it in their left.

Anosodiaphoria is thought to be related to unilateral neglect, a condition often found after damage to the non-dominant (usually the right) hemisphere of the cerebral cortex in which patients seem unable to attend to, or sometimes comprehend, anything on a certain side of their body (usually the left).

The frontal lobe is thought to be the primary area for the lack of emotional insight seen in anosodiaphoria, such as in frontotemporal dementia. A recent 2011 study done by Mendez and Shapira found that people with frontotemporal dementia also had a loss of insight more properly described at "frontal anosodiaphoria", a lack of concern for proper self-appraisal. Patients were found to have a lack of emotional updating, or concern for having an illness; an absence of an emotional self-referent tagging of information on their disorder, which they think is possibly from disease in the ventromedial prefrontal cortex, anterior cingulate-anterior insula area, especially on the right.

Treatment
Indifference to illness may have an adverse impact on a patient's engagement in neurological rehabilitation, cognitive rehabilitation and physical rehabilitation. Patients are not likely to implement rehabilitation for a condition about which they are indifferent. Although anosognosia often resolves in days to weeks after stroke, anosodiaphoria often persists. Therefore, the therapist has to be creative in their rehabilitation approach in order to maintain the interest of the patient.

See also
 Anosognosia
 Body schema
 Brain damage
 Frontotemporal dementia
 Indifference
 Oliver Sacks
 Unilateral neglect

References

Neurological disorders
Symptoms and signs of mental disorders